The Raduša ambush was an ambush by the National Liberation Army of Macedonia that occurred on June 23, 2001 near the village of Raduša when a group attacked a Macedonian police column of two vehicles. One of the vehicles managed to drive out of the kill zone while the other was damaged and managed to resist the attack.

Battle 

The police commander, Aco Stojanovski, and five other policemen were on route to visit a local imam divided in two vehicles. They were attacked by automatic weapons and rocket propelled grenades. The commander was in a Zastava that was damaged by a rocket propelled grenade was wounded while the other vehicle, a Lada Niva, managed to evade the ambush and reach a nearby checkpoint. Stojanovski held off the attacked with automatic fire and managed to get his two wounded colleagues out of the vehicle. The ambush lasted 40 minutes before an Army APC arrived to evacuate the wounded and drove the NLA back.

See also 
Battle of Raduša

References 

2001 insurgency in Macedonia
Ambushes in Europe